Shweta Tiwari (born 4 October 1980) is an Indian actress who primarily works in Hindi television. She is best known for playing Prerna Sharma in Ekta Kapoor's soap opera Kasautii Zindagii Kay. In 2010, she participated in Bigg Boss and emerged as the winner, thus becoming the first female winner of the series. Other reality shows to her credit include Nach Baliye, Jhalak Dikhhla Jaa and Khatron Ke Khiladi.

Tiwari has also worked in television shows like Parvarrish as Sweety, Begusarai as Bindiya and Mere Dad Ki Dulhan as Guneet Sikka. Currently, she is seen playing the titular lead Aparajita in Zee TV's Main Hoon Aparajita.

Personal life

Tiwari married actor Raja Chaudhary in 1998 and they have a daughter (Palak Tiwari), born on 8 October 2000. She filed for a divorce in 2007 after nine years of marriage. Tiwari reported she suffered a troubled relationship characterized by Raja's alcoholism and domestic violence. She complained that he used to beat her up daily. He used to turn up on the sets of her shows and misbehave with her.

Tiwari and actor Abhinav Kohli married on 13 July 2013 after dating for three years. On 27 November 2016, Tiwari gave birth to their son Reyansh Kohli. Reports of problems in their marriage first emerged in 2017. In August 2019, she filed a complaint of domestic violence against Kohli alleging harassment by him towards her and her daughter. Kohli was taken into police custody. Tiwari and Kohli separated in 2019.

Media image
As of October 2022, Tiwari's net worth is around 11 million dollars.

Filmography

Films

Television

Web series

Music videos

Accolades

References

External links

 
 
 

 

Living people
1980 births
People from Pratapgarh, Uttar Pradesh
Actresses from Mumbai
Indian film actresses
Indian television actresses
Indian soap opera actresses
Indian women television presenters
Indian television presenters
Actresses in Hindi cinema
Actresses in Hindi television
Actresses in Bhojpuri cinema
Actresses in Punjabi cinema
Actresses in Kannada cinema
Actresses in Marathi cinema
Actresses in Urdu cinema
Indian expatriate actresses in Pakistan
Reality show winners
Violence against women in India
Bigg Boss (Hindi TV series) contestants
Big Brother (franchise) winners
Fear Factor: Khatron Ke Khiladi participants
21st-century Indian actresses